Vanjari may refer to:

 Vanjari (caste), a nomadic tribe with origins in Rajasthan or northern India
 Vanjari, Punjab, a town Union Council of Mianwali District, Pakistan